The Journal of Social and Personal Relationships is a peer-reviewed academic journal covering research on social and personal relationships. It was established in 1984 by SAGE Publications, originally in association with the International Network on Personal Relationships, which merged with the International Society for the Study of Personal Relationships to form the International Association for Relationship Research. The editor-in-chief is Melissa Curran (University of Arizona).

Abstracting and indexing
The journal is abstracted and indexed in Scopus and Social Sciences Citation Index. According to the Journal Citation Reports, the journal has a 2020 impact factor of 3.039.

References

External links

SAGE Publishing academic journals
English-language journals
Social psychology journals
Publications established in 1984